Manuel Juan Washington Abdala Remerciari, aka el Turco (born 8 September 1959, in Montevideo) is a Uruguayan lawyer and politician.

He was a National Representative for the Colorado Party from 1995 till 2010. In 2000, with Jorge Batlle elected President of the Republic, Abdala was appointed President of the Chamber of Deputies of Uruguay, and he served from 2000 to 2001.

Lately he is devoted to television and stand-up comedy shows.

References

External links

1959 births
Living people
People from Montevideo
Uruguayan people of Lebanese descent
Colorado Party (Uruguay) politicians
Presidents of the Chamber of Representatives of Uruguay
20th-century Uruguayan lawyers
University of the Republic (Uruguay) alumni